Colditz is a Big Finish Productions audio drama based on the long-running British science fiction television series Doctor Who.

Plot
The Seventh Doctor and Ace are caught intruding in Colditz Castle in October 1944. Will the secrets of Time Travel fall into the hands of the Third Reich?

Cast
The Doctor — Sylvester McCoy
Ace — Sophie Aldred
Feldwebel Kurtz — David Tennant
Hauptmann Julius Schäfer — Toby Longworth
Flying Officer Bill Gower — Nicholas Young
Timothy Wilkins — Peter Rae
Klein — Tracey Childs

Notes
This was the first Big Finish Doctor Who adventure in which David Tennant participated; in 2005, he became the tenth actor to play the Doctor in the television series.
When Ace and the Doctor discover where and when they've landed, Ace says "Nazis again; I can't stand Nazis."  Ace previously encountered Nazis in the television serial Silver Nemesis.  The television serial The Curse of Fenric, in which Ace also appeared, was set during World War II but did not feature any German characters. Later in her personal timeline, Ace encounters Nazis again in the novel Timewyrm: Exodus.
Ace mentions having "played the board game" about escaping from Colditz; see Colditz Castle in popular culture for images of several such games.
The plot of this story centres on a time paradox caused by Ace's CD Walkman. After Ace is killed during a failed escape attempt, the Nazis examine her CD Walkman and discover laser technology. They use this to refine uranium more efficiently than the Americans, winning the atomic race and with it, the war. After escaping from Colditz in the TARDIS, the Doctor realises this and returns to Nazi-occupied Europe in 1953, where he is shot and killed by guards. After regenerating, the Eighth Doctor infiltrates the Nazi Government and manipulates a scientist, Elizabeth Klein, into piloting his TARDIS on a test flight, back to Colditz in 1944. However, Klein's presence in 1944 alerts the Seventh Doctor to the existence of Klein's alternate timeline and he is able to prevent it from coming to pass.
Ace mentions that she got her CD Walkman in the 21st century from Paul Tanner, a character in the earlier audio play The Fearmonger.
Tracey Childs later appeared in the 2008 TV episode The Fires of Pompeii starring her Colditz co-star David Tennant.
Klein returns as the Seventh Doctor's travelling companion in the 2010 audio story A Thousand Tiny Wings. How she ended up meeting the Seventh Doctor at Colditz is explored in the one part story Klein's Story.

External links
 Big Finish Productions – Colditz

Seventh Doctor audio plays
2001 audio plays
Colditz Castle
Works by Steve Lyons
Fiction set in 1944